Roger Fortin (born October 27, 1951 in Montreal, Quebec) is a retired boxer from Canada, who represented his native country at the 1976 Summer Olympics. There he was defeated in the first round of the men's light heavyweight division (– 81 kilograms) on points (0:5) by Soviet Union's Anatoliy Klimanov.  Fortin won the gold medal at the 1978 Commonwealth Games in Edmonton in the light heavyweight classiciation.

1976 Olympic record
Below is the record of Roger Fortin, a Canadian light heavyweight boxer who competed at the 1976 Montreal Olympics:

 Round of 32: lost to Anatoliy Klimanov (Soviet Union) on points, 0-5.

References
 Canadian Olympic Committee

1951 births
Boxers at the 1976 Summer Olympics
Boxers at the 1978 Commonwealth Games
Commonwealth Games gold medallists for Canada
French Quebecers
Light-heavyweight boxers
Living people
Olympic boxers of Canada
Boxers from Montreal
Canadian male boxers
Commonwealth Games medallists in boxing
20th-century Canadian people
21st-century Canadian people
Medallists at the 1978 Commonwealth Games